The former French diocese of Cavaillon (Lat. dioecesis Caballicensis) existed until the French Revolution as a diocese of the Comtat Venaissin, a fief of the Church of Rome. It was a member of the ecclesiastical province headed by the Metropolitan Archbishop of Avignon. Its seat was at Cavaillon, in the south-eastern part of what is now France, in the modern department of Vaucluse.

The cathedral was officially dedicated to the Blessed Virgin Mary (Nôtre Dame), but popularly honored Saint Veranus, the sixth-century bishop of Cavaillon.  In 1202 the cathedral had a Chapter composed of a Provost, a Precentor, and a Sacristan, to which were added the Archdeacon and 12 Canons.

After the Concordat of 1801, the territory of the diocese passed to the diocese of Avignon.

Bishops

To 1400

 Genialis
439–451: Julien
c. 459: Porcien
517–529: Philagrius
c. 549: Praetextatus (Pretextat)
c. 585: Saint Veran
c. 788: Lupus (Fr. Loup)
c. 875: Hildebold
906–916: Renard
c. 951: Heribert
c. 972: Didier I.
976–979: Walcaud
c. 982: Dietrich
991–1014: Enguerrand
c. 1031: Peter I.
c. 1055: Clement
1070–1075: Raoul
1082–1095: Didier II.
c. 1103: Johannes I.
c. 1140 – c. 1155: Alfant
1156–1178: Benedict
1179–1183: Pons I.
1184–1202: Bermond
1203 – c. 1225: Bertrand de Durfort
c. 1230 – c. 1250: Gottfried I.
1251–1261: Rostaing Belinger
1267–1277: Giraud
1278 – c. 1280: André I.
1282 – c. 1310: Bertrand Imbert
1311–1317: Pons II Auger de Laneis
1322 – c. 1327: Gottfried II.
c. 1330: Berenger I.
c. 1332: Raimond
3 August 1334 – 1366: Philippe de Cabassole
 23 September 1366 – 11 October 1388: François de Cardaillac, O.Min. (transferred to Cahors)
 15 October 1388 – 1392: Hugo (Hugues) de Magialla
 16 December 1392 – c. 1405: Andreas (André) (Administrator)

From 1400

c. 1405: Pierre II.
c. 1408: Guillaume I.
c. 1409–1421: Nicolas de Johannaccio
1421–1424: Guillaume II.
1426 – c. 1430: Bernard Carbonet de Riez
c. 1432: Ferrier Galbert
c. 1433: Jean II. de La Roche
c. 1437: Barthélémi
1439 – 28 January 1447: Pierre Porcher
22 February 1447 – c. 1466–7: Palamède de Carretto
9 February 1467 – c. 1484?: Toussaint de Villanova, O.Carm.
? c. 1496: Jean Passert
15 July 1496 – 22 April 1501: Louis Passert of Padua
28 April 1501 – 1507: Bernardino or Beranger Gamberia de Benasque
22 November 1507 – 13 August 1524: Cardinal Giovanni Battista Pallavicini
9 September 1524 – 24 June 1537: Mario Maffei of Volterra
6 July 1537 – 16 July 1540: Cardinal Girolamo Ghinucci (Administrator)
1541 – c. 1568: Pietro (Pierre) Ghinucci
1569–1584: Cristoforo (Christophe) Scotti (of Piacenza)
1584–1585: Domenico (Dominique) Grimaldi (promoted Archbishop of Avignon)
1585–1591: Pompeo Rocchi of Lucca (Pompée Rochi de Lucques)
27 February 1592 – 1596: Giovanni Francesco Bordini, Orat. (promoted to Avignon)
1597–1608: Girolamo Cancelli (Jerome Centelles)
1610–1616: Cesare Ottavio Mancini (Octave Mancini)
1616–1646: Fabrice de La Bourdaisière
23 September 1646 – 1657: Louis de Fortia (transferred to Carpentras)
1657 – 23 July 1659: François Hallier
1660 – 27 June 1663: Richard de Sade
4 September 1665 – 21 December 1707: Jean-Baptiste de Sade de Mazan
9 September 1709 – 30 July 1742: Joseph de Guyon de Crochans (promoted Archbishop of Avignon)
30 July 1742 – 28 March 1757: François-Marie Manzi (promoted Archbishop of Avignon)
28 March 1757 – 5 September 1760: Pierre-Joseph Artaud
16 February 1761 – 1790: Louis-Joseph Crispin des Achards de La Baume (fled to Italy)

Titular See
In January 2009 the bishopric was revived by Pope Benedict XVI as a titular see, to provide the ever-increasing number of auxiliary bishops and Vatican bureaucrats with prelatial episcopal status. Theoretically, the titular bishop of Cavaillon belongs to the ecclesiastical province of Marseille.  The current incumbent since 2009 is Krzysztof Zadarko, Auxiliary Bishop of Koszalin-Kołobrzeg (Poland).

See also
 Catholic Church in France
 List of Catholic dioceses in France

References

Bibliography

Reference works
 pp. 531–532.
  (in Latin) p. 178-179.
 (in Latin) p. 123.
 p. 161.
 p. 143.
 p. 152.
 p. 157.

Studies
 second edition (in French)

 
Cavaillon
1801 disestablishments in France